K-177 is a  south–north state highway in central Kansas. It runs from U.S. Route 54 (US-54) near El Dorado northward to US-24 in Manhattan, passing through the Flint Hills. It is part of the Flint Hills Scenic Byway and the Prairie Parkway.

Route description

From its beginnings at US-54 east of El Dorado, K-177 heads northward for  then crosses Bird Creek. The highway then curves northeast and travels about  then curves back north. It continues about  then begins to cross the Bemis Creek leg of El Dorado Lake, providing access to El Dorado Lake along the way. It continues north for  then crosses the Satchel Creek leg of El Dorado Lake. K-177 continues another  then crosses Durechen Creek. The highway then crosses a BNSF Railway track, then curves northeast and begins to parallel it along with I-35 and Kansas Turnpike. The highway continues northeast then enters the city of Cassoday. In the city, the highway turns north at junction with Stony Creek Road. K-177 continues north through the city before exiting the city at a junction with Sunbarger Street. As it exits the city it crosses Walnut Creek then reaches an interchange with I-35 and KTA at exit 92. K-177 continues north for  then reaches the Chase County line, where it curves north and begins to parallel it. After  it curves northeast into the county.

Into the county it begins to parallel the BNSF Railway again, then crosses it and curves north. The highway soon crosses Jack Creek then curves northeast. The highway continues northeast between the railway and Mercer Creek. K-177 curves north at road and enters the city of Matfield Green as Reed Street. It soon exits the city and continues about  past the city then curves northwest. The highway curves back north and crosses Crocker Creek. It continues north through the unincorporated community of Rural. About  past Rural, K-177 crosses Kirk Creek. Continues for  along the railway then curves northward. The highway then crosses Rock Creek and passes to the west of the unincorporated community of Bazaar. Over the next  the highway goes through a series of curves then straightens out as it continues north. K-177 crosses Buck Creek, then enters the city of Cottonwood Falls as Walnut Street at a junction with 8th Street and Findley Street. The highway continues north then crosses the Cottonwood River as it exits the city. It continues north for  then enters Strong City as Cottonwood Street and continues north. It then crosses a BNSF Railway then turns west onto 4th Street. It exits the city then crosses Fox Creek and reaches an interchange with US-50 as it curves north. K-177 continues north through  through Tallgrass Prairie National Preserve. It exits the preserve and continues north through a series of curves then turns northeast. It continues for about  then enters into Morris County.

About  into the county, the highway curves north. After about  it curves northeastward and follows to the east of Spring Creek. K-177 curves more northward and crosses Fourmile Creek then intersects 4 Mile Road. It continues north for about  then enters the city of Council Grove as Neosho Street. The highway then curves northwest as it crosses Elm Creek. K-177 then reaches a junction with US-56, also known as Main Street. Here K-177 turns east anb begins to follow US-56 as the two cross the Neosho River. K-177 then turns north onto Union Street and US-56 continues east. It exits the city and begins to run along the east shore of Council Grove Lake. It then crosses Munkers Creek as it passes by the north end of the lake. The highway continues north for  then intersects G Avenue. After another  it intersects and begins to overlap K-4. The two highways continue north for  then K-4 turns east toward K-99. K-177 curves northwest and crosses a Union Pacific Railway. It then crosses West Branch Mill Creek then enters into Geary County. Roughly  into county, K-177 curves north then intersects. It continues for about  then intersects Schendman Road. After about  it curves northwest, then curves back north after . The highway then crosses Deadman Creek as it continues north. After  it reaches an interchange with I-70 and US-40 at exit 313. Here K-177 becomes a 4-lane expressway as it continues north, then enters into Riley County. It continues north into the county and after about  begins to curve to the northwest then intersects K-18. Here K-177 turns west and begins to follow K-18. The two highways cross the Republican River and enter the city of Manhattan. Just inside the city, the two highways split and K-177 heads north. K-177 soon ends at a junction with US-24.

Flint Hills Scenic Byway is a portion of K-177 located in the Flint Hills region of the state, stretching from Interstate 35 at Cassoday north to US-56 at Council Grove. Along the byway there are rolling hills and some of the only tallgrass prairie left in North America. It is a National Scenic Byway. The section of K-177 from I-70 north to K-18 is part of the Native Stone Scenic Byway.

From I-70 to US-24, K-177 is named the Coach Bill Snyder Highway, in honor of the long-time Kansas State University football coach.

K-177 is two lanes from US-54 to I-70 and a four-lane expressway from I-70 to US-24.

The Kansas Department of Transportation (KDOT) tracks the traffic levels on its highways, and in 2018, they determined that on average the traffic varied from 280 vehicles per day slightly southeast of Cassoday to just over 13200 vehicles per day between K-18 and US-24. The second highest was the section between I-70/US-40 and K-18 which was between 7540 and 8720 vehicles per day. The section of K-177 from I-70 and US-40 to the northern terminus is part of the National Highway System. The National Highway System is a system of highways important to the nation's defense, economy, and mobility. K-177 also connects to the National Highway System at its southern terminus (US-54), and its junctions with I-35 by Cassoday and US-50 by Strong City. All but  of K-177's alignment is maintained by KDOT. The entire section of K-177 within Council Grove is maintained by the city. The  section of K-177 in Manhattan from K-18 north to the northern terminus is maintained by the city.

History
K-177 was signed as K-13 until 1965. It previously ended at US-77 before El Dorado Lake was completed.

K-213 began at K-13 and began travelling northwest, paralleling the Union Pacific Railroad and Big Blue River. It continued north then entered the city of Randolph, where it intersected US-77 and K-16. On January 14, 1957, K-213 was established from K-13, where it turned east and crossed the Big Blue River, north to Randolph. In an April 8, 1964 resolution, K-13's southern terminus was truncated to Manhattan. At this time the section of K-13 from El Dorado to K-213, along with K-213 was redesignated as K-177.

The $25 million project is expected to be completed in 2020.

In September 2019, KDOT approved several projects along K-177 in Chase County. Three bridges will be replaced, including a $2.3 million bridge connecting K-177 to US-50 just west of Strong City, a $1.9 million bridge over Fox Creek, a $1.3 million bridge over a Fox Creek drainage area and a $436,000 bridge over Bloody Creek southeast of Cottonwood Falls.

On April 2, 2020, work began to replace the creek over Munkers Creek north of Council Grove. The $4.7 million project being completed by Bridges Incorporated from Newton is expected to be completed by March 2021. Traffic was reduced to one lane of traffic during construction.

Junction list

References

External links

 Kansas Highway Maps: Current, Historic, KDOT

177
Transportation in Butler County, Kansas
Transportation in Chase County, Kansas
Transportation in Morris County, Kansas
Transportation in Geary County, Kansas
Transportation in Riley County, Kansas
Manhattan, Kansas metropolitan area